This is a list of places of interest in the British county of Nottinghamshire. See List of places in Nottinghamshire for a list of settlements in Nottinghamshire.

Ashfield

Bassetlaw

Other 

 All Saints' Church, Babworth
 Church of St. John the Baptist, East Markham
 Church of St. Mary the Virgin, Clumber Park
 St Peter's Church, East Drayton
 Harley Gallery and Foundation
 St Giles' Church, Elkesley
 St Gregory's Church, Fledborough
 St John the Evangelist's Church, Carlton in Lindrick
 St Mary's Church, Norton Cuckney
 St Oswald's Church, Dunham-on-Trent
 St. Peter's Church, Headon-cum-Upton

Broxtowe

Gedling

Mansfield

Other 

 Mansfield Museum

Newark and Sherwood

Other 

 Beth Shalom Holocaust Centre

Nottingham

Other 

 National Videogame Arcade
 Seller's Wood
 Wilwell Farm Nature Reserve

Rushcliffe 

Nottinghamshire